Rails & Ties is a 2007 American drama film directed by Alison Eastwood and written by Micky Levy. It tells the story of a young boy and his mentally-ill widowed mother who commits suicide in her car by parking on a railroad track. The boy confronts the train engineer who accidentally killed his mother, urging him and his wife to raise him after escaping from an unkind foster mother. The two agree to raise him; however, it is later revealed that his wife is dying of breast cancer. Kevin Bacon portrays the train engineer, Marcia Gay Harden plays his sick wife, and Miles Heizer portrays the boy.

Plot 
Laura Danner is a mentally ill, single mother who takes illegal drugs and is unable to care for her 10-year-old son Davey. Driven to despair, she decides to commit suicide by driving a car on to a railway track, taking Davey with her. She offers him some tranquillisers beforehand but, unbeknownst to her, he spits them out. His mother drives on to the tracks. As a  train approaches, Davey tries in vain to drag her out of the car, himself jumping clear just in time. Two train crewmen, Tom Stark and Otis Higgs, seeing the car on the tracks ahead, argue about whether an emergency stop will derail the train or not. However, the train hits and kills the boy's mother. Subsequently, the railroad company calls for an internal inquiry and suspends the two drivers pending an informal inquiry.

Davey has spent the first night after the incident with an empathetic social worker, Renee. However, she places the boy with a cold-hearted, disciplinarian foster mother who immediately declares to the boy that she would have preferred a girl.   Later on, after being confined to his room for insulting the foster mother while she berated him in the kitchen, he escapes by shattering first a picture frame on the wall, and then used the shattered glass to cut out the screen in the open window. The authorities are alerted and a missing persons search is initiated. The boy obtains train conductor Tom Stark's home address. He turns up at the Starks' home and berates Tom for accidentally killing his mother in the train crash, but eventually he is placated. Tom's wife Megan insists on letting the boy stay although Tom initially disapproves. Caring for Davey gradually helps the couple rebond with each other.

Megan is suffering from breast cancer which has returned and spread to her bones.  Having already undergone a mastectomy, she has decided that she will no longer endure chemotherapy and must accept her inevitable death. The couple have no children, partly due to Megan's illness and partly because of Tom's job. Tom is unable to deal with his wife's illness and implores her to continue treatment. Meanwhile, the social worker, Renee, hearing that the boy may have sought out the Stark's home, arrives at the house and even searches it, suspecting the boy is there, but finds only a visibly sick Megan Stark. The family continues to bond, but the social worker keeps an eye on the family. When she sees them out in the park for a picnic, she decides to call the police, but stops when she realizes that the boy is clearly part of a devoted family.

Megan's condition deteriorates and Davey discovers that she is indeed dying. He has a fit, blaming himself not only for Megan's death but also for the suicide of his own mother. Tom Stark placates the boy, reassuring him that it is not his fault. A few hours prior to her death, Megan tells a saddened Davey how much she loves him. She dies in her sleep. Some time after the funeral, Tom informs Davey that it is perhaps now time to contact the social worker to see if he can adopt him. The film ends with Tom and Davey approaching Renee's office hand-in-hand.

Cast 
 Kevin Bacon as Tom Stark
 Marcia Gay Harden as Megan Stark
 Miles Heizer as Davey Danner
 Marin Hinkle as Renee
 Eugene Byrd as Otis Higgs
 Bonnie Root as Laura Danner
 Steve Eastin as N.B. Garcia
 Laura Cerón as Susan Garcia
 Margo Martindale as Judy Neasy
 Kathryn Joosten as Mrs. Brown

Reception
The review aggregator website Rotten Tomatoes gives the film a score of 34% based on reviews from 47 critics. The website's consensus reads, "Despite the strong cast, Rails & Ties is an emotionally overwrought, not entirely believable melodrama."

References

External links
 
 

2007 films
2007 directorial debut films
2007 drama films
2000s American films
2000s English-language films
American drama films
Films about cancer
Films about suicide
Films produced by Robert Lorenz
Malpaso Productions films
Rail transport films
Warner Bros. films